Kevin Green (born 16 January 1935) is a former Australian rules footballer who played with Essendon in the Victorian Football League (VFL). After his two season with Essendon, Green returned to his original club, Broadford.

Notes

External links 		
		

Essendon Football Club past player profile
				

1935 births
Living people
Australian rules footballers from Victoria (Australia)
Essendon Football Club players